Tmesisternus multiplicatus is a species of beetle in the family Cerambycidae. It was described by Charles Joseph Gahan in 1915.

References

multiplicatus
Beetles described in 1915